Kas Haverkort (born 18 November 2003) is a Dutch racing driver and the 2020 Spanish F4 champion. He competes in the 2023 Formula Regional European Championship with Van Amersfoort Racing.

Career

Karting 
Haverkort started karting in 2011. His major karting highlights included 2nd in the WSK Final Cup - OK, 1st in the 2017 German Junior Kart Championship, 3rd in the CIK-FIA Karting Academy Trophy in 2016, 2nd in the 2013 Chrono Karting Winter Series, 1st in the 2012 Chrono Rotax Max Winter Cup Micromax and 3rd in the 2012 Chrono Dutch Rotax Max Challenge - Micromax.

Lower formulae 
In 2020 Haverkort made his car racing debut in the F4 Spanish Championship with MP Motorsport. He dominated the championship, taking 13 victories and a total of 17 podium finishes from 21 races. The Dutchman finished 111 points ahead of teammate Mari Boya and took the title during the penultimate round of the campaign at Jarama, having won all three races of the weekend.

Formula Renault Eurocup 
Haverkort made some appearances in Formula Renault as a guest driver for rounds 6 and 7 with MP Motorsport. In his first Qualifying session he set the 8th fastest time at Catalunya he finished the first race 9th and the second race 5th. At Spa he finished 5th in both races. Kas was ineligible for points as he was a guest driver.

Formula Regional European Championship

2021 
In December 2020 Haverkort did the group test at Paul Ricard for MP Motorsport. Three months later the team announced that he would be driving for them in the 2021 Formula Regional European Championship, partnering Franco Colapinto and fellow F4 graduate Oliver Goethe. His first points finish came in the fourth round of the season when he ended up seventh at Le Castellet, and he followed that up with a sixth place at his home race in Zanvoort. The Dutchman went scoreless for the next three events, but he would finish in the points on three occasions in the final four races, getting a season-best fourth in Monza. Haverkort ended his season in 16th place with a total of 35 points.

2022 

For the 2022 season Haverkort switched to Van Amersfoort Racing. He stated that joining Van Amersfoort would be "key to reaching [his] goals for the [2022] season" after setting the fastest laptime in a test at the Circuit de Barcelona-Catalunya.

2023 
Haverkort remained with Van Amersfoort Racing for the 2023 Formula Regional European Championship.

Karting record

Karting career summary

Racing record

Racing career summary 

† As Haverkort was a guest driver he was ineligible for points.
* Season still in progress.

Complete F4 Spanish Championship results 
(key) (Races in bold indicate pole position) (Races in italics indicate fastest lap)

Complete Formula Regional European Championship results 
(key) (Races in bold indicate pole position) (Races in italics indicate fastest lap)

References

External links
 
  (in Dutch)

2003 births
Living people
Dutch racing drivers
Spanish F4 Championship drivers
Formula Renault Eurocup drivers
Formula Regional European Championship drivers
MP Motorsport drivers
Van Amersfoort Racing drivers
Karting World Championship drivers
People from Hardenberg